"I Didn't Mean To" is a song by American hip hop artist Casual. The song was recorded for his debut album Fear Itself (1994) and released as the second single for the album in January 1994.

Track listing
12", 33 RPM, Vinyl
"I Didn't Mean To" (LP Version) - 3:39
"I Didn't Mean To" (Instrumental) - 3:39
"I Didn't Mean To" (Remix) - 3:23
"I Didn't Mean To" (Remix Instrumental) - 3:23
"That's How It Is - Part II" - 3:29(feat. A-Plus)

Personnel
Information taken from Discogs.
engineering – Matt Kelley
mix engineering – Chris Trevett
mixing – Casual, Domino
production – Casual, Toure
remixing – Casual, Mike G

Chart performance

References

External links

1994 singles
Casual (rapper) songs
1994 songs
Jive Records singles